Nicholas John Crittenden (born 11 November 1978) is an English former professional footballer who played as a right midfielder.

Career
Crittenden was a Chelsea youth team player before being released in August 2000 after making just two substitute appearances in the league and a further appearance in the League Cup. He was loaned out to Plymouth Argyle in 1998 in order to gain first team experience. He joined the then Conference side Yeovil Town on professional terms. He was with Yeovil for three years, winning the Football Conference and the FA Trophy during his time with the Glovers. He played 163 games and scored some important goals for Yeovil, including one against Blackpool in the FA Cup and the goal that won the game away at Bristol Rovers in 2003.

After four seasons, he moved on from Yeovil, joining Aldershot Town in 2004. With Aldershot, he played in the Conference play-off semi-final at the end of the 2004–05 season, which Aldershot lost on penalties. He moved to Weymouth on a free transfer for the 2006–07 season, before signing for rivals Dorchester Town in the summer of 2008.

On 15 January 2015, following the departure of manager Graham Kemp, Crittenden was placed in temporary charge of Dorchester Town on a caretaker basis. Crittenden was then appointed player-assistant boss to new player-manager Mark Jermyn.

Career statistics

Managerial statistics

Honours
Yeovil Town
FA Trophy: 2001–02

References

External links

1978 births
Living people
English footballers
English football managers
Association football midfielders
Premier League players
English Football League players
National League (English football) players
Chelsea F.C. players
Plymouth Argyle F.C. players
Yeovil Town F.C. players
Aldershot Town F.C. players
Weymouth F.C. players
Dorchester Town F.C. players
Dorchester Town F.C. managers
England semi-pro international footballers